The Victorino Cunha Cup is an annual Angolan basketball tournament held in honour of former Angolan basketball coach Victorino Cunha. The 2nd edition (2010), ran from October 6 to 9, and was contested by four teams in a round robin system. Petro Atlético was the winner.

Schedule

Round 1

Round 2

Round 3

Final standings

See also
 2010 BAI Basket
 2010 Angola Basketball Cup
 2010 Angola Basketball Super Cup

References

Victorino Cunha Cup seasons
Victorino